Friedhelm Dick (3 April 1944 – 5 August 1999) was a German footballer who played as a defender. He made 126 appearances in the Bundesliga, all of them for Rot-Weiß Oberhausen.

References

External links 
 

1944 births
1999 deaths
German footballers
Association football defenders
Bundesliga players
SC Westfalia Herne players
Rot-Weiß Oberhausen players